Fuhlenau is a river of Schleswig-Holstein, Germany. Near Innien it unites with the Buckener Au forming the Bünzau.

See also
List of rivers of Schleswig-Holstein

Rivers of Schleswig-Holstein
Rivers of Germany